Ravivarma is a Hindu male name used in India. It may refer to:

People
 Ravi Varma Kulasekhara, 14th century warrior king of Quilon, Kerala
 Ravi Varma of Padinjare Kovilakam (1745–1793), rebel prince regent of Calicut, Malabar
 Raja Ravi Varma (1848–1906), Indian artist
 Maharaja Ravi Varma Kunjappan Thampuran (1865–1946), Maharaja of Cochin
 Ravi Varma (stunt director) (born 1974), Indian stunt director
 Ravi Varma (actor) (fl. 2005–present), Indian actor who acts primarily in Telugu films

Other uses
 Ravivarma (film), a 1992 Indian Kannada film

See also
 Ravivarman Sharmila (fl. 1993–2000), Indian national carrom champion
 Ravi Varman (fl. 1999–2018), Indian cinematographer, filmmaker, producer and writer